Chondrostoma soetta, or the Italian nase,  is a species of freshwater fish in the family Cyprinidae. It is found in Italy, Slovenia, and Switzerland. Its natural habitats are rivers and freshwater lakes. It is threatened by habitat loss and predation and competition from introduced species such as roach, wels catfish and the common nase. It has been extirpated from Slovenia and numbers are declining in the Italian and Swiss lakes of Lake Como, Lake Lugano, Lake Maggiore, Lake Iseo and Lake Garda. Some population which are descended from fish introduced to other lakes in Italy appear to be thriving.

References

External links
 

Chondrostoma
Freshwater fish of Europe
Fish described in 1840
Taxa named by Charles Lucien Bonaparte
Taxonomy articles created by Polbot